= Universitatea Cluj-Napoca =

Universitatea Cluj-Napoca may refer to:

- Babeș-Bolyai University, an education institution from Cluj-Napoca
- FC Universitatea Cluj, a sports club from Cluj-Napoca
